Eragrostis tremula is an annual grass that is native to tropical Africa, India and Myanmar. It is found in sandy soils and abandoned cultivation.

Description
Ascending culms can grow up to 75 centimeters.

Uses
It is used as fodder for cattle and eaten in times of food scarcity.

References

tremula
Bunchgrasses of Africa
Grasses of India